Halqeh Sara (also Romanized as Ḩalqeh Sarā; also known as Ḩalqeh Sar and Khalgeser) is a village in Rud Pish Rural District, in the Central District of Fuman County, Gilan Province, Iran. At the 2006 census, its population was 139, in 39 families.

References 

Populated places in Fuman County